Tsuneonella flava is a Gram-negative, aerobic, rod-shaped and non-motile bacterium from the genus Tsuneonella which has been isolated from isolated from mangrove sediments from the Jiulong River in China.

References 

Sphingomonadales
Bacteria described in 2018